The Untere Steinach (or Lower Steinach, in its upper course: Rehbach) is a river in Bavaria, Germany. It flows into the Schorgast in Untersteinach.

See also
List of rivers of Bavaria

References

Rivers of Bavaria
Rivers of Germany